Vaillancourt Folk Art (VFA) is a business specializing in hand-painted chalkware trinkets, based in Sutton, Massachusetts. Co-founder Judi Vaillancourt is credited with having developed the process used to create the first contemporary use of chalkware—incorporating a plaster-like substance with confectionery moulds—since the 20th century version.

The company initially was created as a store that sold a wide variety of holiday and Folk Art items, and operated as Vaillancourt Folk Art & Friends. In 2007, the name was shortened to Vaillancourt Folk Art when their headquarter relocated, and the company's emphasis re-focused to their own chalkware and ornament line. The VFA lines have since been carried in stores within major cities across the United States and Canada.

Beyond families holiday traditions, Vaillancourt Folk Art has become a staple in regional tourism. In 2009 VFA was chosen by the Massachusetts Office of Travel and Tourism as one of six behind-the-scenes places to visit and by The Great Places in Massachusetts Commission as one of the top 1,000 great places in Massachusetts to visit.

History
Gary Vaillancourt and wife Judi Vaillancourt founded Vaillancourt Folk Art in 1984 after Gary had given Judi three antique chocolate molds for Christmas. Judi (who, "first discovered her love for historic details from the time spent perusing antiques (growing up) at her neighbor's historic-tavern-turned-home in Sutton, MA"), a classical illustrator by trade, first poured these molds with chocolate, and later with beeswax, before developing her unique process to create a solid chalkware figures. Recognizing this as a 3-dimensional canvas, Judi began to use her oil painting skills to the new medium. During the first year Gary and Judi were asked to participate in a Folk Art Show by Chicago-based promoter, Judy Marks. Judi Vaillancourt, discovered by Marks from an article on Historical House Reproductions by Early American Life, decided to participate in the show with her original furniture, scherensnites, wooden Noah's Arks, oil paintings, and figurines. For the first show Judi had made several beeswax and one hand-painted chalkware Santa. The hand-painted figural sold for $25 ($50 with 2007 inflation) and the Vaillancourts had taken 25-30 orders.

In 1985 Gary left his position as President of Mitchell Management Systems to join Judi as they started what is now known as Vaillancourt Folk Art. That year, the Vaillancourts brought hired 15 employees to work within their house, pouring the products in their kitchen, paint in their dining room, and ship out of their bed room. By the end of 1985 they had converted their 18th century house's basement into a production studio and formed Vaillancourt Folk Art & Friends.

Expansion
Vaillancourt Folk Art underwent a period of expansion in the late 1980s. Vaillancourt Folk Art acquired an 1820 Farm House in 1987 and moved production to the second floor within the first month of acquisition. Within the same year, the first floor of the building was turned into a retail store featuring Vaillancourt Folk Art chalkware and work of American Folk Artists that the Vaillancourt family had met while doing Art and Craft shows around the country.

"In 1985, there were about 135 companies in America that made Christmas figures. Today, there are a half dozen" While Vaillancourt Chalkware was widely sold over the first 15 years of business, they received a large boom in business in the post 9/11 era because they were "Made in America". Their patriotic line and their "American Christmas Series" collection—having partnered with American Christmas companies Byers's Choice and Lynn Haney collection, became an instant success. Much of this success is attributed to the fact that Vaillancourt is one of the last remaining crafters still designing by hand in the United States. Vaillancourt has always been focused on creating pieces that could be passed on from generation to generation, creating an heirloom piece.

In 2007 Vaillancourt Folk Art moved its operations into a 10,000-sq/ft space within the Manchaug Mills, accommodating the extensive collection of designs and antique confectionery molds---Vaillancourt Folk Art has over 3,000 antique moulds from as early as 1850 which is one of the largest known private collections in the United States. The US Postal Service modified its zip codes to ensure that Vaillancourt Folk Art could still be considered "made in Sutton" rather than the village of Manchaug's unique zip code. Within this new Sutton location, Vaillancourt Folk Art dropped "& Friends" from its name and stopped selling other manufactures products and instead focused on displaying its own brands within their gallery. This new location allowed for the opening a Christmas museum "to display [their] antique [moulds], some paired with Judi’s original castings, and they have collected original European catalogues showing the moulds available at the time". The expansion also streamlined its studios for guided tours.

In Winter of 2009 Vaillancourt Folk Art completed the construction of Blaxton Hall, "named after William Blaxton, the first European settler in Boston and Rhode Island". The hall was created to host Gerald Charles Dickens (the great great grandson of Charles Dickens) for his American Tour of A Christmas Carol first in 2009. Dickens made a special trip from London to perform his great-great grandfather’s classic tale, ‘A Christmas Carol.’ Dickens adopted different voices, expressions and mannerisms to portray each of the story’s twenty-six characters in this acclaimed one-man show. Dickens' visit to Worcester county is notable as Charles Dickens himself had toured the region first in 1842 in which Gerald performs at Blaxton Hall in a similar manner.

Continuing the 2008 success of combining family owned, domestic businesses, of the "American Christmas Series," Vaillancourt Folk Art and Byers' Choice teamed up again in 2012 with the creative power of Joyce Byers and Judi Vaillancourt to introduce the first ever Byers' Choice Caroler designed in collaboration with another company. The piece, Custom Christmas Artist Caroler, was introduced during the 17th annual Collector's Weekend at the Vaillancourt Studio by Bob Byers, Jr., President of Byers' Choice.

Within the year 2018, after successful expansions in retail and wholesale, fueled by growth with eCommerce, Vaillancourt underwent a company rebranding to avoid the confusion of the term "folk art" and to pay respect to their Massachusetts heritage. This corresponds to the company's internal expansion and reconfigurations of both their digital department and retail division.

Today, Vaillancourt goes beyond the traditional idea of Christmas as Judi designs more than 100 chalkware Santas a year, which include non-Christmas Santas, such as: an Easter Santa and the Nantucket Santa which is introduced each summer.

Distribution
Vaillancourt Folk Art began its wholesale distribution in 1989. Several years late, in 1992, Nordstrom West was the first Department store to approach Vaillancourt Folk Art to sell their product nationally. Today, Vaillancourt Folk Art sells to 300 stores nationwide, including, Rogers's Garden, Nordstrom, Neiman Marcus, Lord and Taylor, Macy's/Bloomingdales, Frontgate Catalog, and hundreds of small "mom-and-pop" stores

Vaillancourt Folk Art launched its web site in 1998 and has focused on marketing to individuals along with companies. In 2007 its on-line distribution started to slowly match the company’s in-store sales, especially in an economy that was suffering from a yearlong fuel surcharge, through various on-line shopping promotions. Even in a down economy, Vaillancourt Folk Art has remained hopeful in the American consumer choosing American-made, high quality products. In fact, their partnership with Xerox Corporation helped keep them ahead of the curb in terms of marketing technology enabling their studios to be popular tourist stops for New England and being chosen by the Massachusetts Office of Travel and Tourism as one of six behind-the-scenes places to visit alongside: Cape Cod Potato Chips, Cisco Brewers, Fenway Park, Boston Beer Company, and Harbor Sweets.

Divisions
Chalkware  was a Victorian art form where plaster was molded and painted with watercolors. These pieces, considered the "poor man's porcelain" was often given as prizes at carnivals. Vaillancourt Folk Art's main product is a contemporary form of chalkware using vintage confectionery moulds to shape a plaster-like substance that is then hand painted with oil paints.

Classical Christmas Creamware is a line developed by the artist, Judi, as an alternative to traditional dinnerware. A cream ware company in Stoke-On-Trent produces Judi's designs the same way as they were produced in the early 18th century, by hand. The manufacturer is the last cream ware company producing this type of product in Europe, most companies have moved their operations to China.

Mouth-Blown Glass Ornaments were interpretations of the popular Chalkware figurines. Vaillancourt Folk Art developed its ornament line in 1996 with a small German glass company. In 2001 the German manufacturer went out of business and Vaillancourt Folk Art moved its glass operations to a small Polish factory that still mouth-blows and hand-paints each ornament. In 2009, Vaillancourt Folk Art introduced a glimmer line that is "best described as contemporary, but (remains) within the scope of traditional country décor.

Gorham Silver was the first manufacturer to license Judi's designs, manufacturing ornaments in Taiwan under the name Vaillancourt Folk Art for Gorham in 1986.

Possible Dreams was a manufacturer that licensed Judi's designs in the late 1990s.

Et Cetera
In 2008 Vaillancourt Folk Art released a line that incorporated Judi's designs and art work on everyday pieces items, such as dishes, treasure boxes, serving trays, and metal ornaments. These products, adhering to Vaillancourt Folk Arts belief in local, are being manufactured in Maine and Virginia.

Vaillancourt Design Group
Led by son, Luke M. Vaillancourt, Vaillancourt Design Group was formed to bring custom designs on American-made product, for companies and organizations looking to create high-quality fundraising items, alumni gifts, product for fundraisers, or personalized gifts. Designs have included acrylic coasters for Worcester Academy, enamel coasters for College of the Holy Cross, and metal ornaments for organizations like Old Sturbridge Village and wedding favors.

Consumables
Started in 2018, Vaillancourt Folk Art launches a consumable product line with private label coffee and wine after partnering with two Massachusetts companies.

Philanthropy
Starlight Children's Foundation
In 1991 the Starlight Children's Foundation made a presentation to the major gift companies of America, including Vaillancourt Folk Art, which resulting in Judi designing an annual Starlight Santa with a portion of proceeds of sales benefiting critically and chronically ill children. As of 2009, Vaillancourt Folk Art has granted 104 wishes and purchased 15 Fun Centers for pediatric hospitals in New England. Vaillancourt Folk Art's involvement with philanthropic organizations has yielded dozens of awards from the Starlight Children's Foundation, Pediatric Division of University of Massachusetts Hospital, The United States, Retailers Association of Massachusetts, and other organizations. Over the lifetime of the relationship between Vaillancourt Folk Art and the Starlight Foundation, Vaillancourt has received celebrity endorsements from General Hospital star Emma Samms and Dancing With The Stars host Tom Bergeron. Most recently, Tom Bergeron made an appearance at the Vaillancourt Studios in 2009 to help celebrate the 10-year anniversary of the Vaillancourt-Starlight relationship. In 2014, with the Starlight Children's Foundation closing its local offices the year prior, Vaillancourt Folk Art announced that donations would go directly to "Worcester’s UMass Memorial Children’s Medical Center where it will be used to help kids get through whatever treatment they are undergoing through the Child Life’s Artist In Residence Program.".

Community
In 1992, Gary Vaillancourt worked with the Worcester County Convention & Visitors Bureau (WCCVB) to create the "Chain of Lights" which was a multi-town program where local businesses would coordinate efforts to promote their services. Each event would feature a special lighting ceremony which would link all of Central Massachusetts as a "Chain of Lights." During its 1992 kick off, it stretched as far north as Westminster Village Inn and extended through Worcester and Sturbridge Counties. The town of Sutton's original participation was called the "Christmas Tasting In Sutton" where business leaders from Vaillancourt Folk Art, Pleasant Valley Country Club, Eaton's Candy, and Known Orchards would pool their resources to rent a trolley that would travel between each business. At Vaillancourt Folk Art, the inaugural year corresponded with the Starlight Foundation fundraiser through the sale of the highly sought-after Starlight Santa. The first "Wassail Tasting" included a meet-and-greet with Tom Bergeron, then of WBZ-TV. As part of the WCCVB's commitment to the program, the night would conclude with a town-wide celebration at the Common as the Christmas lights are turned on. Since then, many towns throughout Worcester Country has ceased their coordinated celebrations when the WCCVB discontinued the program. Sutton, however, continues to celebrate this event as their own having formed a local committee made up of volunteers, business owners and organizations, giving up countless hours in order to support this town-wide event for the next generation. Since the first year in 1992 with only one trolley and four stops, today there are several trollies among multiple routes, connecting a dozen town business forming a "Chain of Lights" in Sutton. 

In 2010 Massachusetts State Administration and Regulatory Oversight held a hearing that would designate Vaillancourt Folk Art as the official state Christmas collectible maker.

Vaillancourt Folk Art took active rolls in the Sutton 300 (300th anniversary of the town of Sutton, Massachusetts) and also for the Millbury Bicentennial Celebration (Millbury, Massachusetts) in 2010. For each celebration Judi Vaillancourt designed a limited edition Chalkware Santa which featured imagery and symbolism to the town it was created for. The Millbury Bicentennial’s Santa stood 6-inches tall and was dressed in the town’s traditional maroon with his gold sack holding a single lamb symbolizing the town’s rich history in the wool manufacturing industry, and is reminiscent of the Millbury Woolies mascot. Two hundred pieces were painted for the Millbury Bicentennial Celebration and 300 were painted for the Sutton 300 Celebration.

In popular culture
Vaillancourt Folk Art's involvement with the Starlight Children's Foundation brought their company into the national spotlight with celebrity support and appearances. In 1991 Soap Opera star Emma Samms and TV personality Tom Bergeron made their first appearance to the Vaillancourt studios. April 26–27, author and illustrator Tasha Tudor spent a weekend at Vaillancourt Folk Art meeting fans and speaking on a panel about illustration and art. More recently, fans met Tom Bergeron during the peak of his career hosting Dancing with the Stars November 2008. Tom Bergeron has made several appearances at the Vaillancourt Studios to support the company and their work with the Starlight Foundation. On January 24, 2010, History Channel's TV Show American Pickers featured a photograph of the Abraham Lincoln chalkware piece that was created for several museums, including, Gettysburg, Ford’s Theatre, and The Lincoln Museum. Judi and Gary Vaillancourt unveiled the Abraham Lincoln piece, along with a Civil War Santa, on September 4, 2010, at the Gettysburg NMP Bookstore after being asked by the museums to create commemorative figures based on the drawings of 1860s artist Thomas Nast. In addition to cultural institutions, in 2014 Vaillancourt Folk Art created the first Las Vegas Santa made exclusively for Wynn Las Vegas.

Collectors are known to have camped out for days at a time in order to purchase limited edition and low number pieces, as well as to be the first to meet celebrities during their Vaillancourt appearances. Many of the older pieces have become collectibles and have easily double and tripled in value from their release date.

Vaillancourt Chalkware and Ornaments have been seen on Lifetime TV's movies Christmas a la Mode (2019) and Christmas on Ice (2020), both directed by John Stimpson. Additionally, Stimpson directed and produced A Cape Cod Christmas (2021) which aired on AMC and contained Vaillancourt chalkware and ornaments in several scenes. In 2021, director Marius Balchunas began the film About Fate (set to air in 2022) which includes a storefront decorated to look like Vaillancourt Folk Art's Sutton storefront.

References

Decorative arts
Sutton, Massachusetts